Pulaski County is a county located in the U.S. state of Indiana.  According to the 2010 U.S. census, the population was 13,402.  The county seat is Winamac.

History 
Pulaski County was organized in 1835.

Geography 

Major highways
  U.S. Route 35
  U.S. Route 421
  Indiana State Road 14
  Indiana State Road 39
  Indiana State Road 114
  Indiana State Road 119
  Indiana State Road 143

Railroads 
 CSX Transportation

Adjacent counties
 Starke County (north)
 Marshall County (northeast)
 Fulton County (east)
 Cass County (southeast)
 White County (south)
 Jasper County (west)

Municipalities

Towns
The municipalities in Pulaski County, and their populations as of the 2010 Census, are:
 Francesville – 879
 Medaryville – 614
 Monterey – 218
 Winamac – 2,490

Census-designated places
 Star City – 377

Other unincorporated places
 Beardstown
 Clarks
 Denham
 Lakeside
 Lawton
 Pulaski
 Radioville
 Ripley
 Thornhope
 Vanmeter Park

Townships
The 12 townships of Pulaski County, with their populations as of the 2010 Census, are:

Education 
Public schools in Pulaski County are administered by four districts:
 Eastern Pulaski Community Schools
 West Central School Corporation
 Culver Community Schools
 North Judson-San Pierre Schools

High Schools
 Winamac Community High School
 West Central High School

Middle Schools
 Winamac Community Middle School
 West Central Middle School

Elementary Schools
 Eastern Pulaski Elementary School
 West Central Elementary School

Hospitals
 Pulaski Memorial Hospital, Winamac – 25 beds

Climate and weather 

Government

The county government is a constitutional body, and is granted specific powers by the Constitution of Indiana, and by the Indiana Code.

County Council: The county council is the fiscal-legislative branch of the county government and controls all the spending and revenue collection in the county. Four members are elected from county districts, and three are elected at-large. The council members serve four-year terms. They are responsible for setting salaries, the annual budget, and special spending. The council also has limited authority to impose local taxes, in the form of an income and property tax that is subject to state level approval, excise taxes, and service taxes.

Board of Commissioners: The executive-legislative body of the county is the board of commissioners. The commissioners represent geographic districts, but are elected county-wide, in staggered terms, and each serves a four-year term. One of the commissioners, typically the most senior, serves as president. The commissioners are charged with adopting and executing legislation, collecting revenue, and managing the day-to-day functions of the county government.

Court: The county maintains a small claims court that can handle some civil cases. The judge on the court is elected to a term of four years and must be a member of the Indiana Bar Association. In some cases, court decisions can be appealed to the state level circuit court.

County Officials: The county has several other elected offices, including sheriff, coroner, auditor, treasurer, recorder, surveyor, and circuit court clerk Each of these elected officers serves a term of four years and oversees a different part of county government. Members elected to county government positions are required to declare party affiliations and to be residents of the county.

Pulaski County is part of Indiana's 2nd congressional district and in 2016 was represented by Jackie Walorski in the United States Congress.

Demographics 

As of the 2010 United States Census, there were 13,402 people, 5,282 households, and 3,707 families residing in the county. The racial makeup of the county was 97.2% white, 0.7% black or African American, 0.3% American Indian, 0.2% Asian, 0.6% from other races, and 1.0% from two or more races. Those of Hispanic or Latino origin made up 2.4% of the population. In terms of ancestry, 32.4% were German, 12.2% were Irish, 8.6% were English, and 8.2% were American.

Of the 5,282 households, 31.5% had children under the age of 18 living with them, 55.6% were married couples living together, 9.0% had a female householder with no husband present, 29.8% were non-families, and 25.6% of all households were made up of individuals. The average household size was 2.50 and the average family size was 2.97. The median age was 41.7 years.

The median income for a household in the county was $47,697 and the median income for a family was $50,903. Males had a median income of $43,624 versus $27,131 for females. The per capita income for the county was $20,491. About 13.4% of families and 17.2% of the population were below the poverty line, including 28.5% of those under age 18 and 8.3% of those age 65 or over.

See also
 National Register of Historic Places listings in Pulaski County, Indiana
 Tippecanoe River State Park

References

External links
 Pulaski County official website
 Eastern Pulaski Community Schools
 West Central School Corporation
 Culver Community Schools
 North Judson-San Pierre Schools

 
Indiana counties
1839 establishments in Indiana
Populated places established in 1839
Sundown towns in Indiana